Elections to Rochdale Council in Greater Manchester, England were held on 6 May 2010, the same day as the General Election, with one-third of the council facing the voters. The Liberal Democrats lost control of the council.

After the election, the composition of the council was:
Liberal Democrat 26
Labour 22
Conservative 11

Election result

Ward Results

Balderstone and Kirkholt ward

Bamford ward

Castleton ward

Central Rochdale ward

East Middleton ward

Healey ward

Hopwood Hall ward

Kingsway ward

Littleborough Lakeside ward

Milkstone and Deeplish ward

Milnrow and Newhey ward

Norden ward

North Heywood ward

North Middleton ward

Smallbridge and Firgrove ward

South Middleton ward

Spotland and Falinge ward

Wardle and West Littleborough ward

West Heywood ward

West Middleton ward

References

BBC 2008 Rochdale election result
Rochdale Council election, 2008 - nominations
Rochdale Councillor information
2008 - local election results
Rochdale Borough Local Election 2008
Night of joy for Lib Dems

2010 English local elections
May 2010 events in the United Kingdom
2010
2010s in Greater Manchester